Sisterella is a musical, presented and produced by Michael Jackson with Miramax Films in association with Tribeca. Music, lyrics and book are by Larry Hart. The original choreographer was Ramon Del Barrio.

The musical has been described as a "spoofy Cinderella-based African-American musical." It was originally planned for a Broadway run in the fall of 1997. The show sold out its March to April 1996 original run at the Pasadena Playhouse in Pasadena, California. It toured the United States, Europe and Australia. Hart created the book and the music with the reader workshops at the New York's Musical Theatre Works, which did the workshops on Disney's Beauty and the Beast.

Plot summary

The show is an original musical based on the tale of Cinderella.

Cast
 Yvette Cason as Dahlia in the original production, Tina Cross in the 1998 run
 Jimmie Wilson as Prince Jean-Luc in the original production, Donny Rae Evins in the 1998 run
 Wanda Houston as Magnolia
 Rain Pryor as Chrysanthemum, Billie Stapleton in the 1998 run
 Gregory McKinnon as King
 Della Miles as Ella
 Jim Ryan as Lord Monty Grubman in the original run, Red Symons in the 1998 run
 Richard O'Brien as Dr. Cranium
 Jody Keith Barrie as Dr. Goniff
 Larry Hart as Indursky

References

Works based on Cinderella
Plays based on fairy tales
African-American plays
American musicals
Musicals based on works by Charles Perrault